Maurice Elwood Frump (July 15, 1901 – August 14, 1979) was an American football guard who played one season in the National Football League with the Chicago Bears. He initially played football while he was a student at the prestigious Lake Forest Academy and thereafter played college football at Ohio Wesleyan University.

References

External links
Just Sports Stats

1901 births
1979 deaths
Lake Forest Academy alumni
Players of American football from Ohio
American football offensive guards
Ohio Wesleyan Battling Bishops football players
Chicago Bears players